The Ministry of Agriculture, Fisheries and Food (MAFF) was a United Kingdom government department created by the Board of Agriculture Act 1889 (52 & 53 Vict. c.30) and at that time called the Board of Agriculture, and then from 1903 the Board of Agriculture and Fisheries, and from 1919 the Ministry of Agriculture and Fisheries. It attained its final name in 1955 with the addition of responsibilities for the British food industry to the existing responsibilities for agriculture and the fishing industry, a name that lasted until the Ministry was dissolved in 2002, at which point its responsibilities had been merged into the Department for Environment, Food and Rural Affairs (Defra).

On its renaming as the Ministry of Agriculture, Fisheries and Food in 1955, it was responsible for agriculture, fisheries and food. Until the Food Standards Agency was created, it was responsible for both food production and food safety, which was seen by some to give rise to a conflict of interest. MAFF was widely criticised for its handling of the outbreak of bovine spongiform encephalopathy (more widely known as mad cow disease) and later the outbreak of foot and mouth disease in 2001.

It was merged with the part of the Department for Environment, Transport and the Regions that dealt with the environment (and with a small part of the Home Office) to create a new government department, the Department for Environment, Food and Rural Affairs (Defra) in 2001. MAFF was formally dissolved on 27 March 2002, when the Ministry of Agriculture, Fisheries and Food (Dissolution) Order 2002 (S.I. 2002/794) came into force.

Background
The Board of Agriculture, which later become the Ministry of Agriculture, Fisheries and Food (MAFF), was established under the Board of Agriculture Act 1889. It was preceded, however, by an earlier Board of Agriculture, founded by Royal Charter on 23 August 1793 as the Board or Society for the Encouragement of Agriculture and Internal Improvement, which lasted until it was dissolved in June 1822. Though its founders hoped the board would become a department of state it was never more than a private society which spread useful knowledge and encouraged improvements in farming.

A significant predecessor of the second Board of Agriculture (later MAFF) was the Tithe Commission, which was set up in 1841 under the Tithe Act 1836 and amalgamated with the Enclosure Commissioners and the Copyhold Commissioners to become the Lord Commissioners for England and Wales under the Settled Land Act 1882, responsible to the Home Secretary, which became the Land Department of the new Board of Agriculture in 1889. 
Another predecessor was the Cattle Plague Department, set up by the Home Office to deal with an outbreak of rinderpest in London in June 1865. This was renamed the Veterinary Department of the Privy Council in 1869 and became part of the new Board of Agriculture in 1889.

Board of Agriculture

The Board of Agriculture Act 1889, passed on 12 August, established the Board of Agriculture and combined all Government responsibilities for agricultural matters in one department. The first President of the new Board was the Rt. Hon. Henry Chaplin, there were 90 members of staff and the first annual estimate was for £55,000. From 1892 to 1913, its secretary, the most senior civil servant, was Sir Thomas Elliott.

The Board took responsibility for the Ordnance Survey in 1890, and it took responsibility for the Royal Botanic Gardens, Kew in 1903. Also in 1903, the Board of Agriculture and Fisheries Act 1903 was passed to transfer certain powers and duties relating to the fishing industry from the Board of Trade to what then became the Board of Agriculture and Fisheries.

In 1904, the Board appointed honorary agricultural correspondents throughout the country to liaise with the Board on Regional Matters and to give advice to farmers. In 1911, responsibility for all agricultural matters in Scotland except animal health was transferred to a newly created Board of Agriculture for Scotland. 
Meanwhile, the country was increasingly becoming dependent on imported food. By 1914, the output of home-grown food only met one-third of the country's needs.

World War I

War was declared on 4 August 1914. Good harvests and little interruption to imports of food during the first two years of meant that there were no shortages of food, though the ministry was buying wheat, meat and sugar. The agricultural situation then changed for the worse with a poor crop harvest, failure of the potato crop, declining harvest abroad and increased shipping losses. In 1916, Rowland Prothero was appointed President of the Board of Agriculture with a seat in the Cabinet and with the aim of stimulating food production.

In December 1916, a Ministry of Food was created under the New Ministries & Secretaries Act 1916 and Lord Devonport appointed Food Controller to regulate the supply and consumption of food and to encourage food production. A Food Production Department was established by the Board of Agriculture in 1917 to organise and distribute agricultural inputs, such as labour, feed, fertiliser and machinery, and increase output of crops. Provision of labour provided considerable difficulty as many men working on farms had enlisted but co-operation between the War Office and the Board enabled men to be released to help with spring cultivation and harvest. Also in 1917, the Women's Land Army was created to provide substitutes for men called up to the forces.

The Corn Production Act 1917 guaranteed minimum prices for wheat and oats, specified a minimum wage for agricultural workers and established the Agricultural Wages Board, to ensure stability for farmers and a share of this stability for agricultural workers. The aim was to increase output of home-grown food and reduce dependence on imports.

In June 1917, Lord Devonport resigned as Food Controller to be replaced by Lord Rhondda, who introduced compulsory rationing of meat, sugar and butter in early 1918. By 1918, there were controls over 94% of foodstuffs; the Food Controller bought all essential food supplies and the Corn Production Act guaranteed cereal prices. The ministry had a staff of more than 8,000 with food control committees and divisional commissioners across the country.  The ministry's Wheat Commission took over flour mills and dictated the shape and weight of bread, prohibiting sales of muffins, crumpets and teacakes.  Oats, barley and beans were added to bread.  These measures were said to have saved about 10 million sacks of wheat, but they were not universally welcomed.  Meat was imported from the USA and Argentina and refrigerated merchant ships were equipped with guns from April 1915.  Meat prices were controlled from September 1917, and meat became scarce. Milk production fell during the war by  about 25% and condensed milk imports rose from 49,000 tonnes to 128,000 tonnes.  Lord Rhondda died on 1 July 1918 and was succeeded by John Clynes, MP. The armistice treaty ending World War I was signed on 11 November 1918. Following the war, the Food Controller resigned in 1919 and the Ministry of Food progressively wound down and closed on 31 March 1921.

Ministry of Agriculture and Fisheries

The Ministry of Agriculture and Fisheries Act 1919 abolished the Board of Agriculture and Fisheries and created the Ministry of Agriculture and Fisheries, which took on the powers of the Board and the remaining functions of the Food Production Department established during the war. In 1919 prices of farm produce had risen by 25% compared to prices at the end of the war. The Agriculture Act 1920 set out guaranteed prices for wheat and oats based on the 1919 averages, to be reviewed annually. However, in the early 1920s, prices fell drastically, the Act was repealed, guaranteed prices were replaced by lump sum payments and the Agricultural Wages Board abolished, as part of the Government's deflationary policies. By 1922 virtually all of war-time controls had gone. The area under cultivation in Britain fell from 12 million acres (49,000 km²) in 1918 to 9 million acres (36,000 km²) in 1926. Farm prices continued to decline and then fell by 34% in the three years after 1929.

During this period, the Ministry of Agriculture and Fisheries remained a small department concerned with pest and disease control, agricultural research and education, improvement of livestock, and provision of allotments and smallholdings. Over the next few years, its workload grew.

In the late 1920s and early 1930s the Government introduce new measures to support domestic agriculture and farmers' income. Subsidies or price insurance schemes were created for sugar beet, wheat, cattle, dairy and sheep. The Agricultural Produce (Grading and Marketing) Act 1928 promoted the standardisation of grades and packaging and introduced the "National Mark", a trade mark denoting home-produced food of a defined quality for eggs, beef, apples and pears. The Agricultural Marketing Acts of 1931 and 1933 sought to organise farmers into co-operative marketing associations and created Marketing Boards for bacon, pigs, hops, milk and potatoes. The Import Duties Act 1932 introduced a tariff on most imports including fruit and vegetables and quotas on imports of bacon, ham and other meat products. In 1936 the tithe rent charge was abolished, compensation paid to the Church and the money recovered from farmers over a 60-year period. In 1937 a scheme was introduce to subsidize the spreading of lime on agricultural land to boost the fertility of the soil.  The Food (Defence Plans) Department was established in 1937 and was then constituted as the Ministry of Food on the outbreak of war in 1939. The Minister of Agriculture was given powers to regulate the cultivation and management of land, end tenancies, even take possession of land, under the Emergency Powers (Defence) Act 1939. On 1 September 1939 many of these powers were delegated to County War Agricultural Executive Committees ("War Ags").

World War II

War was declared on 3 September 1939. The UK entered the war well prepared for the maintenance of supplies of food but with less than 40% of the country's needs produced at home. The Ministry of Food was formed on 8 September and William Morrison appointed Minister. The Scientific Food Committee was established in May 1940‎ and outlined a basal diet of 2000 calories. The Ministry of Food became the sole buyer and importer of food and regulated prices, guaranteeing farmers prices and markets for their produce. The Marketing Boards, except for milk and hops, were suspended.

Recruiting began for the Women's Land Army and in 1940, food rationing was introduced. Lord Woolton succeeded William Morrison as Minister for Food. In 1941, the US Lend-Lease act was passed under which food, agricultural machinery and equipment was sent from the US to the UK.

Postwar era

The Ministry of Agriculture and Fisheries and the Ministry of Food were merged in 1955, becoming the Ministry of Agriculture, Fisheries and Food. In the 1970s, the IRA detonated some explosives in front of the Ministry of Agriculture building in Whitehall.

See also
 Forestry Commission
 Lobbying in the United Kingdom
 Minister of Agriculture, Fisheries and Food
 Sir John Sinclair, 1st Baronet
 Arthur Young

References and notes

 Sinclair, J. (1796). Account of the Origin of the Board of Agriculture and its progress for three years after its establishment. London: W. Bulmer and Co.
Ernle, Lord; edited by Hall, G. (1956), English Farming Past and Present, 5th edition. London: Longmans, Green and Co., Chapter XIX The War and State Control, 1914-1918.
Foreman, S. (1991). Loaves and Fishes, an illustrated history of the Ministry of Agriculture, Fisheries and Food 1889-1999. London: MAFF.
Debate on draft Ministry of Agriculture, Fisheries and Food (Dissolution) Order 2002, Fifth Standing Committee on Delegated Legislation, 22 January 2002.
 

Agriculture, Fisheries and Food
United Kingdom
United Kingdom
Economic history of the United Kingdom
Agricultural organisations based in the United Kingdom
Ministries established in 1889
1889 establishments in the United Kingdom
Defunct environmental agencies
2002 disestablishments in the United Kingdom